Bar Aftab-e Sofla (also Romanized as Bar Āftāb-e Soflá; also known as Bar Āftāb-e Pā’īn) is a village in Doshman Ziari Rural District, in the Central District of Kohgiluyeh County, Kohgiluyeh and Boyer-Ahmad Province, Iran. At the 2006 census, its population was 289, in 56 families.

References 

Populated places in Kohgiluyeh County